Invasion is the debut studio album released by American heavy metal band Manilla Road. It was first released in 1980 and was reissued in 2004 in a two-disc package with Metal on the second disc.

Track listing

 "The Dream Goes On" – 6:32
 "Cat and Mouse" – 8:19
 "Far Side of the Sun" – 8:09
 "Street Jammer" – 5:18
 "Centurian War Games" – 3:41
 "The Empire" – 13:32

Credits
Manilla Road 
 Mark Shelton – vocals, guitars
 Scott Park – bass guitar
 Rick Fisher – drums and percussion, backing vocals

Production
Eric Enns, Jon Miller – mixing
Manilla Road – mixing, arrangements, front and back cover design
Sharon Jesik – front cover design
Mike Arnold – photograph

References

Manilla Road albums
1980 debut albums